Yoshitake is a masculine Japanese given name and a Japanese surname.

Possible writings
Yoshitake can be written using many different combinations of kanji characters. Here are some examples: 

義武, "justice, warrior"
義健, "justice, healthy"
義猛, "justice, furious"
義毅, "justice, strong"
吉武, "good luck, warrior"
吉健, "good luck, healthy"
吉猛, "good luck, furious"
吉毅, "good luck, strong"
善武, "virtuous, warrior"
善健, "virtuous, healthy"
善猛, "virtuous, furious"
善毅, "virtuous, strong"
芳武, "fragrant/virtuous, warrior"
芳健, "fragrant/virtuous, healthy"
芳猛, "fragrant/virtuous, furious"
芳毅, "fragrant/virtuous, strong"
好健, "good/like something, healthy"
喜健, "rejoice, healthy"
喜丈, "rejoice, measure of length"
慶健, "congratulate, healthy"
由武, "reason, warrior"
由健, "reason, healthy"

The name can also be written in hiragana よしたけ or katakana ヨシタケ.

Notable people with the given name

, Japanese samurai
, Japanese politician
, Japanese politician
, Japanese samurai
, Japanese footballer

Notable people with the surname
, Japanese singer
, Japanese footballer

Japanese-language surnames
Japanese masculine given names